GFT may refer to:

 French Guiana Time
 Glasgow Film Theatre, Scotland
 Google Flu Trends
 Gafat language, ISO 639-3 code
 GreenFuel Technologies Corporation
 Group field theory
 Former Gulfstream International Airlines, Florida, US, ICAO code